Indian Institute of Management Sambalpur (informally known as IIM Sambalpur; abbreviated as IIM-S) is a public business school located in Sambalpur, Odisha, India. IIM Sambalpur was established in August 2015 as one of the Indian Institutes of Management. It offers mainly four courses, the Post-Graduate Programme (PGP) in Management, Executive Post Graduate Program (EPGP), PhD and Executive PhD Programme in Management.

It is one of the Indian Institutes of Management,new  which was established in August 2015. The first batch of students started in September 2015.

The present campus of IIM Sambalpur is situated at Sambalpur University Campus, Jyoti Vihar, Burla, Sambalpur, Odisha.

History
IIM Sambalpur was announced in 2014 by Ministry of Human Resource Development (MHRD) and was founded on 23 September 2015. The first batch of students started in September 2015.

It was initially mentored by IIM Indore until appointment of its independent director. IIM Sambalpur was registered as a Society under Societies Registration Act, XXI of 1860 on August 19, 2015. The present campus of IIM Sambalpur has been set up at Jyoti Vihar, Burla, Sambalpur, Odisha.

As of 2021 it's headed by Mahadeo Jaiswal as the director.

Campus 

IIM Sambalpur is functioning from its temporary campus at Sambalpur University. The campus houses the one academic block with classrooms and library, canteen, hostels, and an auditorium.

The Government of Odisha has selected  of land for the construction of the permanent campus of IIM Sambalpur at Basantpur.

Prime Minister Narendra Modi laid the foundation stone of the permanent campus on 2 January 2021 and it is expected to be ready by 2022.

Organisation and administration 
The university is governed by a board of governors, which include the chairperson, director, twelve board members and secretary. In 2016, Arundhati Bhattacharya, former Chairperson of the State Bank of India, was appointed as the chairperson of the institute in 2016.

Academics
IIM Sambalpur offers various postgraduate diplomas in management. Admission is based on Common Admission Test conducted jointly by the IIMs and on various other processes conducted by IIM Sambalpur.

Like other IIMs, IIM Sambalpur currently offers master's degree in management as per the approval of the Indian Institute of Management Bill, 2017. These include two-year full-time programmes (PGP), one-year full-time residential programme for experienced professionals (PGPX), and also offers Doctor of Business Administration level fellowship programmes. The institute conducts a number of executive education and faculty development programmes.

Collaborations 

IIMSAM has affiliations with Alba Graduate Business School, Greece. The students of IIM Sambalpur who partake in the exchange program would spend an entire trimester at the host University at no additional academic fees. The agreement allows for the exchange of a limited number of students who are selected on the basis of their interests and a screening process. As a first step of the collaboration between the two premier B-Schools, IIM Sambalpur sent two of its students for a four-day Summer B-School program in Athens. The students learned about the Greek economy, Greek philosophy, visited multiple industries and corporate offices and were taken to some of the famous historical sites in Athens.

Admission 
IIM Sambalpur offers different academic programs and has admission processes and eligibility respectively. Its process is based on the course candidate opt for. CAT score is the basic exam to apply for admission in all of the academic programs. Total seats are further divided into the category where IIM accept admission on the category basis. Good academic record and percentage score is another major aspect.

IIM's also conducts its analytics writing test and personal interview (AWT & PI) in Ahmedabad, Banglore, Hyderabad, Kolkata, & New Delhi cities of selected candidates. Seats in IIMSAM are reserved, based on government instruction 27% of seats are reserved for NC-OBC,  15% for SC, 7.5% for ST candidates, 5% for Persons with Benchmark Disabilities (PwD), and up to 10% for Economically Weaker Sections (EWS).

Ranking 

In India, IIM Sambalpur was ranked 66th overall by the National Institutional Ranking Framework (NIRF) in 2022. While, in 2022, the institute was ranked 61st among management institution in India by the NIRF.

Accreditation and recognition

Placements 
The placement process at IIM Sambalpur is a student-driven process that institutionalises placements for the entire batch. The placement Committee elected by the students liaisons between the Institute administration, students and recruiters. Placements for the PGPs are characterised by two phases - summer placements for the first-year batch and final placements for the graduating batch. The summers process is conducted in Nov/Dec for the first yearites. The second year placement committee handles the process for them. The placement process for the graduating is conducted in two stages. The first is the laterals process in January where firms interview students with prior work experience and offer them mid-level managerial positions. The second stage is the final placement process in around February. This process is handled by the newly elected committee among the PGP1s to avoid any conflict of interest and ensure a fair process. Companies from multiple sectors across different geographies hire candidates for a wide range of functions.

Student life

Accommodation 

There are three hostel buildings and an annex building taken  inside the campus of the institute; two for boys and one for girls. The students of IIM Sambalpur are provided rooms on a twin-sharing basis.

The rooms are properly ventilated and well furnished with a bed, almirah, mattress, study-tables and chairs provided to each student. Housekeeping staff maintains the cleanliness of the rooms on a daily basis.

Wi-Fi has been made available which is accessible from anywhere within the campus premises. Each hostel also has a separate common room where a TV and table tennis facilities are installed to cater to the recreational needs of the students.

Currently there's no provision for Married students so they cannot opt to live with their family in hostels. Stay in dormitories is mandatory for students. Basic amenities including washing machines, refrigerators and TVs are available at each dorm.

Clubs and committees

Events 
The institute organises multiple events each year. Some of the events include Marmagya and Ethos. Marmagya is a two-day annual business conclave organised by the Industry and Alumni Relations Committee. Panel discussions are held on different domains such as marketing, finance and IT/consulting. The theme of Marmagya 2022 was ‘Redefining the business dynamics’.

Ethos is the annual cultural festival of the institute. Its yearly editions have been centred on themes like diversity, colour or going green. Other events such as Ballyhoo Street, Ad selfie etc. are organised under Ethos.

Controversies
In the academic year 2018–19, the institute increased its intake capacity from 60 to 120 students. Since the institute operates from a temporary campus, it failed to arrange hostels for the students, and there were 111 students. Due to a lack of accommodation, 12 students were forced to leave the institute, and the strength of the 4th batch decreased from 111 to 99. The institute director, Mahadeo Jaiswal, alleged that the Government of Odisha had allotted three hostel buildings. Still, Sambalpur University provided only two after the Memorandum of Understanding was signed.

See also 

 List of MBA schools in India

References

Business schools in Odisha
Universities and colleges in Sambalpur
Educational institutions established in 2015
2015 establishments in Odisha